Try My Love is the debut album of Jeremy Jordan. The album peaked #179 in the Billboard charts and four singles were released, the most successful being "The Right Kind of Love". This would be the last studio album released by Jeremy Jordan by a major label. The album sold 400,000 copies worldwide.

Background
In 1990, Jordan wanted to get involved in movies and sign with a talent agency in Chicago, but was forbidden since the orphanage he lived was in Mooseheart, (near North Aurora ), forty miles away, and then in 1991, when Jordan was seventeen years old, before Thanksgiving 1991, he moved to Chicago to stay with a friend's parents. After a fight he was expelled from the house where he was living and ended up homeless, living in the subway until he met his manager Peter Schivarelli. He then signed a record deal with his record company.

Singles
"The Right Kind of Love": released in late 1992 as one of the lead tracks from the Beverly Hills 90210 soundtrack, the song is the most successful single released by Jordan. A music video of the song was also released.
"Wannagirl": released in early 1993, the song charted in USA (#28 in Billboard Hot 100, #11 in Mainstream Top 40, #20 Radio Songs and #24 in Rhythmic (chart)) in Canada (#42 in Top Singles) and Australia (#22 in Top Singles) A music video was released to promote the song.
"Try My Love": released in 1993, a music video directed by Antoine Fuqua was also released.  The song was included in the movie Airborne. The maxi-single includes the Radio edit and the Instrumental version of the song. The "Vocal Breakdown" version can be found in the remixed album Jeremy The Remix.
"My Love is Good Enough": released in 1994, the single was acclaimed by Billboard, with Larry Flick saying: "Jordan shines on what is easily his strongest single to date". It failed to chart and no music video was made. The song was included in the 1993 movie Airborne. The maxi-single includes 4 alternative versions: "InDaSoul Radio Mix" (3:58); "M.Doc & Jere MC Street Radio Mix" (3:56), "Jamie's House Edit" (4:16), "InDaSoul Extended Instrumental" (4:59).

Critical reception

Try My Love received favorable reviews from music critics. Matt Collar from AllMusic gave to the album 3 out of 5 stars and stated that "the album showcases Jordan's soulful if slight voice with a radio-ready, synth-heavy R&B production" and that "while the album does contain altogether too much filler, "Right Kind of Love"'s Todd Rundgren meets Andy Gibb melodic hook almost qualifies it as a classic of the decade."

Track listing

Charts

References 

1993 debut albums
Jeremy Jordan (singer, born 1973) albums